Big Men Cry is an album by Banco de Gaia. It was released in 1997 by Mammoth Records and Planet Dog Records.

The album peaked at No. 77 on the UK Albums Chart.

Critical reception
The Washington Post wrote that "anyone who would name a Floyd-sampling, 12-minute track after The Celestine Prophecy is clearly too cosmic for his own good, but Banco's skillful assemblages frequently transcend their cheesier elements."

Track listing

References

1997 albums
Banco de Gaia albums